Zeus: Master of Olympus is a single-player strategy game developed by Impressions Games and published by Sierra Studios. It is considered to be an additional installment in the City Building series of games. Like previous titles in the series, Zeus focuses on the building and development of a city in ancient times. The game features a number of changes from previous titles in the series, including being set in Ancient Greece as well as changes to certain gameplay mechanics; however, it is considered to be in most aspects very similar to its predecessor, Caesar III.

Game setting and mechanics
Zeus is set in a mythical version of ancient Greece and features many of the gods from the Greek pantheon and legendary monsters from ancient Greek mythology. The game chooses not to accurately portray the historical setting in which it is based, choosing instead to include elements based on mythology and anachronisms.

The player is in charge of building up and governing a city state which requires managing infrastructure, farming, industries, commerce, religion, entertainment and education, as well as wars with rival cities. Monsters from Greek mythology feature in the form of natural disasters which must be managed by the player, typically by hiring the correct hero. Sufficiently worshiping the Greek gods will cause them to bestow blessings on the player's city which provide a material benefit.

The game features 2d graphics and offers an isometric view of the game world. A side panel and a number of menus allow the player to more easily navigate the map and to micro-manage various aspects of government, such as tax rates and wages.

Zeus grants players the choice to play either a series of episodical, story-based adventures, in which a set of unique objectives must be attained in order to progress, or to play the so-called "sandbox mode", in which the game's objectives are more open-ended and less objective-based.

Reception

Zeus: Master of Olympus received "generally favorable reviews" according to the review aggregation website Metacritic. IGN reviewer Steve Butts stated that he "had to tear [himself] away from [the game] to write the review." The game received criticism for its combat and war mechanics.

Jason Samuel of NextGen said of the game, "Overall, it's simpler, the gameplay is finely tuned, and most of all, it's fun."

The game was a finalist for the Academy of Interactive Arts & Sciences' 2000 "Strategy Game of the Year" award, which went to Age of Empires II: The Conquerors.

In May 2012 the game was re-released on GOG.com together with its expansion as a part of the Acropolis bundle where it holds a 5-star rating.

In 2018, Alice Bell of Rock, Paper, Shotgun included the game in the site's "Have You Played" series, describing it as "the perfect balance of beauty, difficulty, detail, and puns." The same publication later listed the game in its top twenty management games on PC to play in 2021.

Expansion

As with Pharaoh, an expansion pack was released in 2001, named Poseidon: Master of Atlantis. The expansion includes new adventures based on the stories of Atlantis by Plato. An adventure editor was also included, although it had already been freely available on Impressions website.

Reception

Poseidon received "favorable" reviews according to Metacritic.

Notes

External links

2000 video games
City-building games
Sierra Entertainment games
Video games based on Greek mythology
Video games developed in the United Kingdom
Video games scored by Keith Zizza
Video games set in antiquity
Video games with expansion packs
Video games with isometric graphics
Windows games
Windows-only games
Impressions Games games
Single-player video games